"First they came ..." is the poetic form of a 1946 post-war confessional prose by the German Lutheran pastor Martin Niemöller (1892–1984). It is about the silence of German intellectuals and certain clergy—including, by his own admission, Niemöller himself—following the Nazis' rise to power and subsequent incremental purging of their chosen targets, group after group. Many variations and adaptations in the spirit of the original have been published in the English language. It deals with themes of persecution, guilt, repentance, and personal responsibility.

Text
The best-known versions of the confession in English are the edited versions in poetic form that began circulating by the 1950s. The United States Holocaust Memorial Museum quotes the following text as one of the many poetic versions of the speech:

A longer version by the Holocaust Memorial Day Trust, a charity established by the British government, is as follows:

Author

Martin Niemöller was a German Lutheran pastor and theologian born in Lippstadt, Germany, in 1892. Niemöller was an anti-Communist and supported Adolf Hitler's rise to power. But when, after he came to power, Hitler insisted on the supremacy of the state over religion, Niemöller became disillusioned. He became the leader of a group of German clergymen opposed to Hitler. In 1937 he was arrested and eventually confined in Sachsenhausen and Dachau. He was released in 1945 by the Allies. He continued his career in Germany as a clergyman and as a leading voice of penance and reconciliation for the German people after World War II.

Origin 
Niemöller made confession in his speech for the Confessing Church in Frankfurt on 6 January 1946, of which this is a partial translation:

This speech was translated and published in English in 1947, but was later retracted when it was alleged that Niemöller was an early supporter of the Nazis. The "sick, the so-called incurables" were killed in the euthanasia programme "Aktion T4". Communists, socialists, schools, Jews, the press, and the Church are named in a 1955 version of Niemöller's speech that was cited in an interview with a German professor who quoted Niemöller. A representative in America made a similar speech in 1968, omitting Communists but including industrialists who were only targeted by the Nazis on an individual basis.

Niemöller is quoted as having used many versions of the text during his career, but evidence identified by professor Harold Marcuse at the University of California Santa Barbara indicates that the United States Holocaust Memorial Museum version is inaccurate because Niemöller frequently used the word "communists" and not "socialists." The substitution of "socialists" for "communists" is an effect of anti-communism, and most common in the version that has proliferated in the United States. According to Marcuse, "Niemöller's original argument was premised on naming groups he and his audience would instinctively not care about. The omission of Communists in Washington, and of Jews in Germany, distorts that meaning and should be corrected."

In 1976, Niemöller gave the following answer in response to an interview question asking about the origins of the poem. The Martin-Niemöller-Stiftung ("Martin Niemöller Foundation") considers this the "classical" version of the speech:

Role in Nazi Germany 
Like most Protestant pastors, Niemöller was a national conservative, and openly supported the conservative opponents of the Weimar Republic. He thus welcomed Hitler's accession to power in 1933, believing that it would bring a national revival. By the autumn of 1934, Niemöller joined other Lutheran and Protestant churchmen such as Karl Barth and Dietrich Bonhoeffer in founding the Confessional Church, a Protestant group that opposed the Nazification of the German Protestant churches.

Still in 1935, Niemöller made pejorative remarks about Jews of faith while protecting—in his own church—those of Jewish descent who had been baptised but were persecuted by the Nazis due to their racial heritage. In one sermon in 1935, he remarked: "What is the reason for [their] obvious punishment, which has lasted for thousands of years? Dear brethren, the reason is easily given: the Jews brought the Christ of God to the cross!"

In 1936, however, he decidedly opposed the Nazis' "Aryan Paragraph". Niemöller signed the petition of a group of Protestant churchmen which sharply criticized Nazi policies and declared the Aryan Paragraph incompatible with the Christian virtue of charity. The Nazi regime reacted with mass arrests and charges against almost 800 pastors and ecclesiastical lawyers. 

Author and Nobel Prize laureate Thomas Mann published Niemöller's sermons in the United States and praised his bravery.

Usage

At the United States Holocaust Memorial Museum in Washington, D.C., the quotation is on display, the museum website has a discussion of the history of the quotation.

A version of the poem is on display at the Holocaust memorial Yad Vashem in Jerusalem. The poem is also presented at the Virginia Holocaust Museum in Richmond, Virginia, the New England Holocaust Memorial in Boston, Massachusetts, the Florida Holocaust Museum in St. Petersburg, Florida, and the Illinois Holocaust Museum and Education Center in Skokie, Illinois.

See also

And Then They Came for Me
Boiling frog
Creeping normality
Democratic backsliding
Foot-in-the-door technique
The Hangman
An injury to one is an injury to all
Night of the Long Knives
Not My Business
Political apathy
Slippery slope
Sorites paradox
Then They Came for Me: A Family's Story of Love, Captivity, and Survival

References

Further reading
 Quotation: "If they come for me in the morning, they will come for you in the night."

External links

German poems
Poems about the Holocaust
Opposition to antisemitism in Germany
Crowd psychology
Political and cultural purges
1940s neologisms
Quotations from religion
Anti-fascist works
Social privilege
Cognitive inertia
Redirects from opening lines
20th-century German literature